The Idhun Chronicles is a Spanish anime-style (also known as “Spanime”) fantasy web series produced by Zeppelin TV for Netflix. It is based on The Idhún's Memories book saga by Laura Gallego.

The series was released globally on September 10, 2020. A second season was released on January 8, 2021, but on the same day, Gallego announced that no agreement had been reached to adapt the second and third books of the trilogy, making Season 2 the final season.

Synopsis
After necromancer Ashran seizes power in Idhún, enforcing his reign of terror through an army of flying snakes, the first battle for the land's freedom will take place on the Earth, where impulsive teenager Jack and aspiring wizard Victoria will face dangerous assassin Kirtash, sent by Ashran to Earth to destroy the Idhunites who fled his tyranny.

Voice cast

Spanish
 Itzan Escamilla as Jack
 Michelle Jenner as Victoria
 Nico Romero as Shail
 Sergio Mur as Kirtash
 Carlos Cuevas as Alsan
 David Jenner as Hybrid Alsan / Alexander
 Pep Ribas as Elrion
 Juan Antonio Bernal as Ashran
 María Luisa Solá as Allegra

English
 Griffin Burns as Jack
 Erika Harlacher as Victoria
 Griffin Puatu as Shail
 Johnny Yong Bosch as Kirtash
 Billy Kametz as Alsan
 Christopher Corey Smith as Elrion
 Joe Ochman as Mago Szish
 Kirk Thornton as Ashran
 Kyle McCarley as Kopt
 Cindy Robinson as Allegra

Production
The series was first announced back in February 2019 by Netflix and was originally set to have 10 episodes in its first season. Author Laura Gallego stated that it would cover the entire first volume La Resistencia (The Resistance).

Episodes

Controversy
Laura Gallego, the writer of the books the series is based on, who also contributed in the show's development, wrote a short statement on her personal website objecting to the substitution of previously cast professional (spanish) voice actors by more popular actors who, save for Michelle Jenner, generally lacked experience in dubbing.

Critical reception
Upon its debut, The Idhun Chronicles was met with mixed to negative reception among critics.

Mikel Zorrilla of Espinof criticized the voice acting, advising readers to switch to the "much more consistent" English dub: "What really makes it difficult to take the story seriously is the disconnect among the voices. It's as if each of [the voice actors] gave it a different approach, without any kind of harmony among them, which makes even the very competent Michelle Jenner seem out of place because none of the other voices fit in, individually or as a whole." He also stated: "Its possible grand spectacle nature is presented in a somewhat restrained way. At half throttle."

John Serba of Decider advised viewers to "skip it", claiming that the show doesn't stand out among Netflix's other anime offerings: "There are hundreds of anime series out there, many on Netflix, and The Idhun Chronicles seems destined to be no more than yet another one among the many". He also criticized the characters' lack of charisma and the excessive amount of exposition in the pilot.

Pere Solà Gimferrer of La Vanguardia stated that the first episode was "a disaster on every level, especially narrative", and cited as an example how the murder of Jack's parents at the beginning is recounted later on "with the same drama as if Jack had forgotten his keys or cut himself with a piece of paper while doing his homework."

References

External links
 The Idhun Chronicles at Netflix
 The Idhun Chronicles on IMDb

2020 animated television series debuts
2020 Spanish television series debuts
2021 Spanish television series endings
Animated action television series
Animated fantasy television series
Animated series based on novels
Animated web series
Anime-influenced animation
Spanish-language Netflix original programming
Television series based on Spanish novels
Spanish fantasy television series
Spanish animated television series
Anime-influenced Western animated television series